Kris Kristofferson (born 1936) is an American singer-songwriter, musician, Rhodes scholar, and film actor.

Kristofferson may also refer to:

 Kristofferson (album), his 1970 debut studio album
 "Kristofferson" (song), a 2008 song by Tim McGraw

See also
 Christoffersen (disambiguation)
Surnames from given names